Bluffton is an unincorporated community in Yell County, Arkansas, United States, located on Arkansas Highway 28,  west-southwest of Plainview. Bluffton has a post office with ZIP code 72827.

Education
It is within the Two Rivers School District. The district operates Two Rivers High School.

References

Unincorporated communities in Yell County, Arkansas
Unincorporated communities in Arkansas